James Gorman (born 1882) is an English former footballer who played as a defender. Born in Middlesbrough, he played for Liverpool  between 1906 and 1908, scoring once in 23 appearances. He also played for Hartlepool United and Leicester Fosse.

References

External links
 LFC History profile

1882 births
1957 deaths
Footballers from Middlesbrough
English footballers
Liverpool F.C. players
Leicester City F.C. players
Hartlepool United F.C. players
English Football League players
Association football central defenders
Footballers from Yorkshire